Andorra competed at the 2017 World Aquatics Championships in Budapest, Hungary from 14 July to 30 July.

Swimming

Andorra has received a Universality invitation from FINA to send two female swimmers to the World Championships.

References

Nations at the 2017 World Aquatics Championships
Andorra at the World Aquatics Championships
2017 in Andorran sport